The XI Mechanized Brigade  “Brigadier General Juan Manuel de Rosas” is a brigade of the Argentine Army. It is based at the “Río Gallegos” Army Garrison.

The Army Command-in-Chief created the “Santa Cruz” Grouping on 7 February 1979.

Structure 

 XI Mechanized Brigade Command. Guar Ej Río Gallegos.
 24th Mechanized Infantry Regiment “General Jerónimo Costa”. Guar Ej Río Gallegos.
 35th Mechanized Infantry Regiment “Coronel Manuel Dorrego”. Guar Ej Rospentek.
 11th Tank Cavalry Regiment “Defensores del Honor Nacional”. Guar Ej Puerto Santa Cruz.
 11th Armored Exploration Cavalry Squadron “Coronel Juan Pascual Pringles”. Guar Ej Rospentek.
 11th Armored Artillery Group “Coronel Juan Bautista Thorne”. Guar Ej Comandante Luis Piedrabuena.
 11th Mechanized Engineer Battalion. UMRE XI. Guar Ej Comandante Luis Piedrabuena.
 11th Mechanized Signals Company. Guar Ej Río Gallegos.
 11th Army Aviation Section. Guar Ej Río Gallegos.
 11th Mechanized Intelligence Company. Guar Ej Río Gallegos.
 “El Turbio” Mechanized Intelligence Section. Guar Ej Rospentek.
 “Río Gallegos” Logistic Support Base. Guar Ej Río Gallegos.
 181st Munition Company. Guar Ej Puerto Santa Cruz.
 Delegation of the Army General Staff in the province of Tierra del Fuego. Base: Ushuaia.

Source: Argentine Army, Ministry of Defence

References 

Brigades of Argentina